The 2018–19 CSA Women's Provincial League was the 24th edition of South Africa's provincial one-day cricket tournament. It ran from October 2018 to March 2019, with 16 provincial teams taking part. North West beat Western Province in the final to win their second one-day title.

Competition format
The 16 teams were divided into three divisions: a top division named "Top 6", and two lower divisions, Pools A and B. Teams played each other team in their group once in a round-robin format, with matches played using a one day format with 50 overs per side.

All six teams in the Top 6 group progressed to a further round of groups, joined by the winners of Pools A and B. The eight teams were divided into two groups, playing each other team in their group once. The top four teams from this stage progressed to the semi-finals, whilst the bottom four teams played in a series of placing matches. The top six placed sides in these matches qualified for the next season's Top 6 league.

The tournament ran concurrently with the 2018–19 CSA Women's Provincial T20 Competition, with matches played either the day before or day after the corresponding encounter between two teams in the T20 tournament. To maintain this link for the following season, promotion and relegation in the Provincial T20 Competition was determined by standings in the Provincial League.

The groups worked on a points system with positions being based on the total points. Points were awarded as follows:

Win: 4 points 
Tie: 3 points 
Loss: 0 points.
Abandoned/No Result: 2 points.
Bonus Point: 1 bonus point available per match.

Teams

Group stages

First round

Top 6

Pool A

Pool B

 Advanced to the second round group stages, joining the Top 6 teams

Second round

Week Pool A

Week Pool B

 Advanced to the semi-finals

Knockout stages

Semi-finals

Final

Final placings
In addition to the semi-finals and final, a number of placing matches took place in Bloemfontein on 28 and 29 March 2019. The top six finishers qualified for the Top 6 league in the following season's tournament. Final placings of the top eight teams were as follows:

References

CSA Women's Provincial Programme
Domestic cricket competitions in 2018–19
2018–19 South African cricket season
2018 in South African women's sport
2019 in South African women's sport